German submarine U-440 was a Type VIIC U-boat built for Nazi Germany's Kriegsmarine for service during World War II.
She was laid down on 1 October 1940 by Schichau-Werke, Danzig as yard number 1491, launched on 8 November 1941 and commissioned on 24 January 1942 under Oberleutnant zur See Hans Geissler. On 20 May 1943, Geissler was replaced as commander by Oberleutnant zur See Werner Schwaff.

Design
German Type VIIC submarines were preceded by the shorter Type VIIB submarines. U-440 had a displacement of  when at the surface and  while submerged. She had two shafts and two  propellers.

U-440 was fitted with five  torpedo tubes (four fitted at the bow and one at the stern), fourteen torpedoes, one  SK C/35 naval gun, 220 rounds, and a  C/30 anti-aircraft gun. The boat had a complement of between forty-four and sixty.

Service history
The boat's career began with training at 5th U-boat Flotilla on 24 January 1942, followed by active service on 1 September 1942 as part of the 1st Flotilla for the remainder of her service. On five patrols she sank no ships.

Wolfpacks
U-440 took part in seven wolfpacks, namely:
 Pfeil (12 – 14 September 1942)
 Streitaxt (29 October – 2 November 1942)
 Delphin (4 – 5 November 1942)
 Spitz (22 – 31 December 1942)
 Neuland (6 – 13 March 1943)
 Dränger (14 – 20 March 1943)
 Seewolf (21 – 29 March 1943)

Fate
U-440 was sunk on 31 May 1943 in the North Atlantic in position , by depth charges from RAF Sunderland from 201 Squadron. All crew members died.

References

Bibliography

External links

German Type VIIC submarines
1941 ships
U-boats commissioned in 1942
Ships lost with all hands
U-boats sunk in 1943
U-boats sunk by depth charges
U-boats sunk by British aircraft
World War II shipwrecks in the Atlantic Ocean
World War II submarines of Germany
Ships built in Danzig
Maritime incidents in May 1943
Ships built by Schichau